Nautla Region is one of the regions of Veracruz, Mexico.

References 

 

Regions of Veracruz